FC Neded Stadion is a football stadium in Neded, Slovakia. It is currently used mostly for football matches and is the home ground of FC Neded. The stadium holds 200 seating people.

References

External links
 Stadium information

Football in Slovakia